Madhu Road National Park is a national park in northern Sri Lanka, approximately  east of Mannar.

History
The Madhu Road area was designated as a sanctuary on 28 June 1968 under the Fauna and Flora Protection Ordinance (No. 2) of 1937.

Following the end of the Sri Lankan Civil War the government announced plans to convert various sanctuaries in the Northern Province into national parks. The sanctuary was subject to illegal sand excavation, tree felling and unplanned development by the government. An Integrated Strategic Environmental Assessment of Northern Province produced by the government with the assistance of United Nations Development Programme and United Nations Environment Programme and published in October 2014 recommended that Madhu Road sanctuary, excluding developed areas, and the surrounding state-owned forests be upgraded to a national park. The Shrine of Our Lady of Madhu would be located inside the national park.

In May 2015 the government announced that Madhu Road, along with Adam's Bridge, Chundikkulam and Delft would be designated national parks.

Flora and fauna
Numerous varieties of birds are found in Madhu Road including Alexandrine parakeet, ashy-crowned sparrow-lark, ashy prinia, ashy woodswallow, Asian koel, Asian palm swift, baya weaver, black drongo, black-hooded oriole, black-rumped flameback, black-winged kite, blue-faced malkoha, brahminy kite, brown-headed barbet, changeable hawk-eagle, common emerald dove, common iora, common myna, common tailorbird, common woodshrike, coppersmith barbet, crested honey buzzard, crimson-fronted barbet, greater coucal, greater racket-tailed drongo, Asian green bee-eater, green imperial pigeon, grey-breasted prinia, house crow, house sparrow, Indian paradise flycatcher, Indian peafowl, Indian robin, Indian roller, Jerdon's bush lark, Jerdon's leafbird, jungle crow, jungle prinia, large cuckooshrike, Malabar pied hornbill, orange-breasted green pigeon, oriental magpie-robin, paddyfield pipit, plain prinia, Sri Lanka green pigeon, purple sunbird, red-rumped swallow, red-vented bulbul, red-wattled lapwing, rock dove, rose-ringed parakeet, scaly-breasted munia, shikra, small minivet, spotted dove, Sri Lanka grey hornbill, Sri Lankan junglefowl, tawny-bellied babbler, white-bellied sea eagle, white-browed bulbul, white-browed fantail, white-rumped munia, white-rumped shama, yellow-billed babbler, yellow-eyed babbler and Zitting cisticola. Mammals found in the park include Asian elephant, bear, chevrotain, chital, golden jackal, grey langur, grizzled giant squirrel, Indian grey mongoose, Indian hare, Indian palm squirrel, leopard, muntjac, purple-faced langur, ruddy mongoose, toque macaque, water buffalo and wild boar.

Notes

References

1968 establishments in Ceylon
Madhu DS Division
Manthai East DS Division
Manthai West DS Division
National parks of Sri Lanka
Protected areas established in 1968
Protected areas in Northern Province, Sri Lanka
Sri Lanka dry-zone dry evergreen forests
Vavuniya DS Division
Venkalacheddikulam DS Division